Kyle McAllister (born 21 January 1999) is a Scottish footballer who plays for Forest Green Rovers, as a midfielder or forward. He came through the youth system at St Mirren, and after moving to England to play for Derby County, he returned to St Mirren on loan in January 2019, and on a permanent basis in August 2019. McAllister has also represented Scotland at under-17 and under-21 level.

Career
McAllister, who attended Renfrew High School, began his career with Scottish Championship club St Mirren, making his first team debut on 13 February 2016, coming on as a second-half substitute in 1–0 defeat against Queen of the South. His first full start for the side came the following week, when the Saints defeated relegation threatened Dumbarton 1–0.

During the 2016–17 season, McAllister made 14 appearances for St Mirren, scoring his first goal in a Scottish Cup match against Lowland League side Spartans, described as "ferocious shot" following a run from his own half. After interest from a number of English clubs, he signed for English Championship side Derby County on 27 January 2017 for an undisclosed fee, reported to be £225,000.

In January 2019, having been unable to break through to the first team at Derby with his progress hampered by a groin injury, McAllister returned to St Mirren on loan until the end of the season. Just days later, he marked his return to the club by scoring the winning goal in a 3–2 Scottish Cup win at home to Alloa Athletic, (it was awarded 'goal of the round', as had his debut strike in 2016) and made 14 Scottish Premiership appearances as the club stayed in the division via the relegation playoff.

On 9 August 2019, McAllister left Derby and signed a three-year contract with St Mirren.

On 31 January 2022, McAllister joined Scottish Championship side Partick Thistle on loan until the end of the season.

On 17 June 2022, McAllister agreed to join recently promoted League One club Forest Green Rovers following his release from St Mirren.

International
Having previously appeared for the under-17 team, McAllister made his debut for the Scotland under-21 team in March 2019.

Career statistics

References

External links

 

1999 births
Living people
Scottish footballers
Footballers from Paisley, Renfrewshire
Association football midfielders
Association football forwards
Rangers F.C. players
St Mirren F.C. players
Derby County F.C. players
Partick Thistle F.C. players
Forest Green Rovers F.C. players
Scottish Professional Football League players
Scotland youth international footballers
Scotland under-21 international footballers